, better known as , is a Japanese comedian who is represented by the talent agency, Yoshimoto Creative Agency. He was a former member of Armstrong. He graduated from Tokyo NSC 6th generation.

Yasumura graduated from Asahikawa Businessman High School.

Filmography

TV series

Radio series

Live shows

Advertisements

Other

References

External links
Official profile 
 

Japanese comedians
1982 births
Living people
People from Asahikawa